Nevada Territory's at-large congressional district is an obsolete congressional district that encompassed the area of the Nevada Territory, which was split off from the Utah Territory in 1861. After Nevada's admission to the Union as the 36th state by act of Congress on October 31, 1864, this district was dissolved and replaced by Nevada's at-large congressional district.

List of delegates representing the district 
On March 2, 1861, an act of Congress gave Nevada Territory the authority to elect a Congressional delegate.

References

Former congressional districts of the United States
At-large United States congressional districts
Territory At-large
1861 establishments in Nevada Territory